Embracing Mainstream Success is the sixth studio album by the Lithuanian-American heavy metal band Steel Wolf. It was released in 2009.

Track listing
 "Shoplifting Bananas"   – 3:36
 "Himnas 2010" - 1:51
 "No Mercy Flush"  – 4:30
 "My Grandma’s Advice"  – 3:21
 "Serving Beer To Miners"  – 3:15
 "Hazardville Headlines"  – 4:59
 "Terry’s Tasty Taco"  – 3:15
 "Gettin’ It (From Both Ends)"  – 4:10
 "Stinkfinger!" - 3:40
 "Depends On Me" - 3:34
 "I Want A 20-Piece" - 3:40
 "Spread The Love Mayonnaise" - 5:42

Critical reception
Although the group is proud of its Lithuanian heritage, it is obvious by [their] song titles that it still finds time to pile on the laughs in a saucy manner [and] straddle the fence between the riff-heavy sounds of 70's British hard rockers and the raw urgency from punk rock days of yore.

Credits
Mark Vytas Adomaitis-Lead vocals, Percussion
Algis Kezys-Drums, Vocals
Paul Naronis-Guitar
Greg Szlezak-Bass / Ellis Spanos-Bass

References

External links
 Official Site http://www.steelwolfband.com

2009 albums